Nitro World Games 2019 was the fourth edition of an action sports competition by Nitro Circus that took place on August 17, 2019, in Erda, Utah.

The games were broadcast live through social media platforms.

Results

Medal count

Podium details

References

External links
Website

2019 in sports in Utah
2019 in multi-sport events
2019 in motorcycle sport